Gliese 163 is a faint red dwarf star with multiple exoplanetary companions in the southern constellation of Dorado. Other stellar catalog names for it include HIP 19394 and LHS 188. It is too faint to be visible to the naked eye, having an apparent visual magnitude of 11.79 and an absolute magnitude of 10.91. This system is located at a distance of 49.4 light-years from the Sun based on parallax measurements. Judging by its space velocity components, it is most likely a thick disk star.

This is a small M-type main-sequence star with a stellar classification of M3.5V. It has a relatively low activity level for a red dwarf of its mass, suggesting it is an old star with an age of at least two billion years. This star has 41% of the mass and radius of the Sun. It is spinning slowly with a projected rotational velocity of 0.85 km/s and has a rotation period of 61 days. The star is radiating just 2% of the luminosity of the Sun from its photosphere at an effective temperature of 3,460 K.

Planetary system 
In September 2012, astronomers using the HARPS instrument announced the discovery of two planets orbiting Gliese 163. The first planet, Gliese 163 b, is a super-Earth or mini-Neptune with an orbital period of 9 days, therefore far too hot to be considered habitable. However, Gliese 163 c, with an orbital period of 26 days and a minimum mass of 6.9 Earth masses, was considered to potentially be in the star's habitable zone, although it is hotter than Earth, with a temperature of 60 deg. C (140 deg. F). It has an eccentricity estimated to be about 0.03, giving it a fairly circular orbit. Evidence was also found for a third planet orbiting further out than c and b.

In June 2013, it was concluded that at least 3 planets orbit around the star with a fourth planet being a possibility, and in a paper submitted to arXiv in June 2019, that and another planet were found, thus giving the system a total of five planets.

References

M-type main-sequence stars
Planetary systems with five confirmed planets
Dorado (constellation)
 
0163
019394
219221189